Charaxes congdoni is a butterfly in the family Nymphalidae. It is found in southern Tanzania (the uplands from Mufindi to Mwanihana) and Malawi. The habitat consists of montane forests from 1,600 to 2,200 meters.

The larvae feed on Albizia - Albizia gummifera and Agelea species.

Taxonomy
Charaxes congdoni is a member of the large species group Charaxes etheocles.

Closest to Charaxes nyikensis and Charaxes alpinus . Also very similar to Charaxes margaretae. Similar to Charaxes mccleeryi   but smaller and with shorter tails (many  mccleeryi are virtually indistinguishable from congdoni in the adult facies but the genitalia differ).

References

External links
Charaxes congdoni images at Consortium for the Barcode of Life 
African Butterfly Database Range map via search
African Charaxes/Charaxes Africains Eric Vingerhoedt taxonomy, images

Butterflies described in 1989
congdoni